Antonio Paolucci (born 29 September 1939) is an Italian art historian and curator. In 2007 he was appointed director of the Vatican Museums by Pope Benedict XVI, a post he held until 2017 when he was replaced by his former deputy, Barbara Jatta. Throughout his career Paolucci has worked also in Florence, Venice, Verona, Mantua and other Italian cities in national art and cultural institutions. He has written many books and articles on art history and made television appearances on a variety of programs to explain and promote art. He is the recipient of numerous awards for his work.

Early life
Antonio Paolucci was born in Rimini. His father was an antiques dealer, and Paolucci's passion for art began through his handling of antique objects found in his father's shop. He studied art history in Florence under Roberto Longhi and graduated in 1964. In 1963, before graduating, he began teaching art history to middle school students in Signa. This experience had a marked effect on his future, as he learned how to capture his students' attention and confirmed for him that complex ideas and concepts could be explained in accessible terms. He has also taught at other institutions including the University of Florence and the University of Siena.

Professional career
Paolucci's first job as a supervisor was in 1968 at the National Museum of Bargello in Florence. He began working for the Soprintendenza per i Beni Culturali for Venice in 1969 and continued there until 1980. After working for the Mantova-Brescia-Cremona region from 1984-1986, he moved to the Department of Artistic Affairs of Tuscany in 1988. Prior to becoming director of the Vatican Museums, Paolucci was, for nearly twenty years, the superintendent of the Polo Museale Fiorentino as well as the director general for cultural heritage in Tuscany. His responsibilities included overseeing sites in Florence such as the Uffizi Gallery, the Pitti Palace, the Boboli Gardens, and the Workshop of Precious Stones (for which he was the director from 1986 to 1988), along with many other sites of significant artistic heritage. He also held the position of Minister of Cultural Heritage from January 1995 to May 1996 under the technical government of Lamberto Dini. Paolucci was appointed the extraordinary commissioner for the restoration of the Basilica of Saint Francis after the earthquake that struck on 26 September 1997 caused considerable damage to the patrimony of the basilica.

Paolucci became director of the Vatican Museums in 2007. His tenure was marked by an increase in visitors from about 4.3 million in 2007 to over 6m in 2015 (and well over 6 million in 2016, according to Barbara Jatta, the vice director). In order to counteract the potential damage to the frescoes that large crowds and the high levels of CO2, dust and perspiration they bring, Paolucci upgraded the climate control system in the Sistine Chapel in 2014, replacing the original air conditioning system installed in 1993 which was designed to manage up to 700 visitors at a time (while presently up to 2000 visitors at a time are allowed in). At the same time, a new lighting system was put in place using about 7000 LEDs to better illuminate the entire chapel at a lower cost. Also under Paolucci's direction visiting hours of the museums were extended into the evenings, and an online system was launched for the public to make their reservations.

Major works published
Paolucci has published numerous monographs and books including works on: Piero della Francesca, Luca Signorelli, Antoniazzo Romano, Michelangelo, Filippo Lippi, Bronzino, Cellini, Giambologna, and the Sistine Chapel, as well as other works on restoration techniques and art history in general. His works have been translated into English, German, French, Spanish, Japanese, as well as other languages.

Personal life
Paolucci and his wife, Giulia, also an art historian, have been married since 1966 and have one son, Fabrizio.

References 

Directors of museums in Italy
Italian art historians
People from Rimini
Living people
1939 births
Italian art curators